Tufail Hoshiarpuri (14 July 1914 – 4 January 1993) was a film song lyricist and a poet from Pakistan.

Early life and career
Muhammad Tufail was born on 14 July 1914 in Hoshiarpur, Punjab, British India which later was changed to Tufail Hoshiarpuri as his professional name. He started his career as a school teacher in his hometown Hoshiarpur, British India. As the call for the British to quit India grew, the Pakistan movement and the All India Muslim League gained popularity. Tufail Hoshiarpuri started reading patriotic poems in Muslim League political gatherings. British authorities suspended him from his job as a school teacher. Agha Saleem Raza, a film actor at that time, introduced him to some film producers and he, therefore, launched his career as a film song lyricist in 1946. He wrote film songs for some films in British India before the independence of Pakistan in 1947.

After the partition in 1947, he migrated to Lahore, Pakistan and started his career as a journalist there. He later joined Radio Pakistan, Lahore in 1952.

Popular film songs

Awards and recognition
Pride of Performance Award by the President of Pakistan in 1994.

Death
Tufail Hoshiarpuri died on 4 January 1993 and was buried in the Model Town, Lahore graveyard in Pakistan.

References

External links

1914 births
1993 deaths
People from Hoshiarpur
Pakistani songwriters
Pakistani poets
Recipients of the Pride of Performance